Staromogilyovsky is a rural locality (a khutor) in Shendzhyskoye Rural Settlement of Takhtamukaysky District, the Republic of Adygea, Russia. The population was 39 as of 2018. There are 2 streets.

Geography 
Staromogilyovsky is located 20 km southeast of Takhtamukay (the district's administrative centre) by road. Novomogilyovsky is the nearest rural locality.

References 

Rural localities in Takhtamukaysky District